Alexander Robey Shepherd is a bronze statue, by Ulric Stonewall Jackson Dunbar. It is located at the John A. Wilson Building, Northwest, Washington, D.C. on the north front.

History
It was dedicated on May 3, 1909, in front of the District of Columbia Municipal Building at 1350 Pennsylvania Avenue, N. W., where it stood from  1909 to 1931. Due to construction of the Federal Triangle, it was moved in 1931 to what is today Freedom Plaza. In 1979 construction began on Freedom Plaza and the statue was placed in storage, most likely at the Blue Plains Advanced Wastewater Treatment Plant, 5000 Overlook Avenue, S.W. It was installed at 4701 Shepherd Parkway, S.W. for a brief period in the 1980s before being returned to its original location in 2005.

See also
 List of public art in Washington, D.C., Ward 6

References

External links

Outdoor sculptures in Washington, D.C.
1905 sculptures
Monuments and memorials in Washington, D.C.
Bronze sculptures in Washington, D.C.
Federal Triangle